Xtreme is an American music duo consisting of members Danny D (born as Danny Mejía on July 23, 1985) and Steve Styles (born as Steven Tejada on November 25, 1985) of Dominican descent. The duo focuses on the Dominican genre bachata. Xtreme was formed in 2003 and since then has enjoyed success among Hispanics in the United States. The original line up included another vocalist name Elvis Rosario, who was also a guitarist in the group. He left after 2005 or 2006.

History

The beginning 
The group was discovered in 2003 by Andre "Dre" Hidalgo. He is the owner and founder of the independent record label 2 Strong Music, which had started the careers of Bachata artists and groups such as Aventura and Prince Royce. Dre discovered Danny D at age 17. Later on he added Elvis Rosario to the lineup. Danny and Rosario were the original members. Steve Styles came in after many auditions were held to find another member, which would eventually convert Xtreme into a trio.

Albums and achievements 
The band's original first album was We Got Next, released in 2003. but they barely had recognition at the time due to being underground. Thus, when they signed to Sergio George's SGZ Entertainment, they had a new start and made their self-titled album, Xtreme, the debut album. Also, Steve Styles was not part of the 2003 album because he joined the group a year later. Which made the 2005 album his first appearance in an album. The album Xtreme was released in 2005 and reached #14 on the Billboard Tropical Albums chart. A re-issued version was made in 2006 due to Elvis Rosario leaving the group. This also meant that Xtreme became once again a duo, but this time it was Steve Styles and Danny D instead of the original line-up.

Haciendo Historia, the group's second album, was released in late 2006 and peaked at #13 on the Billboard Top Latin Albums chart. The single "Shorty, Shorty" has enjoyed similar success, reaching #1 on the Billboard Latin Tropical Airplay chart and #2 on the Hot Latin Tracks chart.

Their latest album, Chapter Dos, was released in 2008. It peaked at #1 on the Billboard Tropical Albums chart. The lead single "Through That Window (Enamorando Estoy)" was a hit but did not perform as well as their previous single, "Shorty Shorty". "Lloro y Lloro" was therefore selected as a second single and given its success, "Baby, Baby" was released as a follow up single. "Baby, Baby" was of course the single from their 2009 album, Chapter Dos: On the Verge. This was either a compilation, remake, or a sequel to Chapter Dos. It contained 5 new songs, 10 songs from Chapter Dos, and "Shorty Shorty" from Haciendo Historia.

Their final concert was held at the 4th Annual Sydney International Bachata Festival in 2011. While they were performing “Te Extraño”, Tanja ‘La Alemana’ Kensinger and Jorge ‘Ataca’ Burgos performed their famous bachata routine.

Hiatus
Danny D

After the separation, Danny D started a solo career. His first singles was "Eres Mi Todo". It peaked #9 on the Billboard Latin Tropical Airplay chart. His last bachata single was "Mátame". His last overall single was "Dream" which was an English R&B song.

Steve Styles

Seteve Styles was originally planning to go as a solo artist. He then met with Lenny Santos (Len Melody) from Aventura to create a song. Since, Aventura had also split in the same year, Lenny Santos ask Styles if he wanted to form a new group. Styles agreed and along with Lenny's brother Max Santos (Max Agenda), they formed Vena. From 2011 to 2015 Styles released 8 singles and an EP live album with them. He went solo in 2015. In 2016, he released his first solo single "El Final", which was also a single that Lenny and Max Santos released under the Vena name featuring Mike Stanley. In 2020, he released his last single "Yo Quiero Ser".

Reunions
The duo would reunite in 2019 for a reunion tour. This was their first tour in 7 years together.

On December 6, 2021, they announced their return on social media. On the same day, they announced their 2022 tour. This was their first tour since the COVID-19 pandemic. On New Years Day, 2022, they announced that new music was coming for 2022. Their tour would last whole year which would conclude in December of 2022.

Discography 
Studio albums

2003: We Got Next (2 Strong Music)
2005: Xtreme (SGZ Entertainment & Re-issued by Univision Music Group)
2006: Haciendo Historia (La Calle Records & Univision Music Group)
2008: Chapter Dos (Machete Music)
2009: Chapter Dos: On The Verge (Machete Music & Universal Music Latin Entertainment)

Compilation albums
2009: 6 Super Hits (EP)
2011: Los Subestimados

Singles

Media 
On May 7, 2009, Xtreme premiered in a reality show for Spanish cable network Mun2, On The Verge. On the Verge had the highest rated premiere in 2009, among any of Mun2's original shows.

References

External links 
 
 MySpace Page
 Mun2 Page

Musical groups from the Bronx
Musical groups established in 2003
American bachata musicians
American musical duos
Machete Music artists
Bachata music groups